The giant muntjac (Muntiacus vuquangensis), sometimes referred to as the large-antlered muntjac, is a species of muntjac deer. It is the largest muntjac species and was discovered in 1994 in Vũ Quang, Hà Tĩnh Province of Vietnam and in central Laos. During inundation of the Nakai Reservoir in Khammouane Province of Laos for the Nam Theun 2 Multi-Purpose Project, 38 giant muntjac were captured, studied, and released into the adjacent Nakai-Nam Theun National Protected Area. Subsequent radio-tracking of a sample of these animals showed the relocation was successful.  The species is also located in parts of  eastern Cambodia, as well as the Trường Sơn Mountains.

It has a red-brown coat and is an even-toed ungulate. Due to slash-and-burn agriculture, combined with hunting, the giant muntjac is considered critically endangered. It is preyed upon by animals such as the tiger and leopard. It is most closely related to the Indian muntjac.

References

External links
 Deer-Pictures.com: Giant Muntjac picture

Muntjac
Mammals of Cambodia
Mammals of Laos
Mammals of Vietnam
Mammals described in 1994